Dinosaur Museum may refer to:

Aathal Dinosaur Museum, Aathal-Seegräben, Switzerland
Dakota Dinosaur Museum, Dickinson, North Dakota
Dinosaur Discovery Museum, Kenosha, Wisconsin, United States
Dinosaur Museum (Dorchester), Dorset, United Kingdom
Dinosaur Walk Museum, Pigeon Forge, Tennessee and Branson, Missouri, United States
Dinosaur World (theme parks), United States
Dinosauria (museum)
Dinosaurland Fossil Museum
Fukui Prefectural Dinosaur Museum
Goseong Dinosaur Museum
Lufeng Dinosaur Museum
Makoshika Dinosaur Museum, Glendive, Montana, United States
Museum of Dinosaurs and Ancient Cultures, Cocoa Beach, Florida, United States
Nalut Dinosaur Museum
National Dinosaur Museum
Phu Wiang Dinosaur Museum
Wyoming Dinosaur Center, Thermopolis, Wyoming, United States